The Kansas City Red Wings were a professional hockey team that operated in the Central Hockey League for two seasons, 1977–78 and 1978-79. They were the top farm team of the NHL’s Detroit Red Wings.

1977-78 season
The Kansas City Red Wings joined the CHL in the 1977-78 season. Coached by Larry Wilson, the team missed the playoffs with a 34-39-3 record for 71 points.

Dave Hanson (a.k.a. Jack Hanson, #16 of Slap Shot fame) played for the Kansas City Red Wings during the 1977-78 season.

1978-79 season
Coached by Larry Wilson, the team compiled a 37-36-3 record for 77 points and made the playoffs, only to lose in the first round.

All-time roster
Showing Games Played, Goals, Assists, Points, Penalty Minutes, Seasons, Position, Date and Place of Birth:
Fred Berry	        65	11	14	25	79	1977-1978	1	C	1956-03-26	Stony Plain, ALTA
Mike Bloom	        76	23	54	77	155	1977-1978	1	L	1952-04-12	Ottawa, ONT
Dan Bolduc	        23	21	11	32	11	1978-1979	1	L	1953-04-06	Waterville, ME
Al Cameron	        70	6	31	37	93	1977-1979	2	D	1955-10-21	Edmonton, ALTA
Roland Cloutier	129	50	67	117	34	1977-1979	2	C	1957-10-06	Rouyn-Noranda, PQ
Steve Coates	63	14	20	34	83	1977-1978	1	R	1950-07-27	Toronto, ONT
Mal Davis	        71	42	24	66	29	1978-1979	1	R	1956-10-10	Lockeport, NS
Mike Frawley	15	0	0	0	0	1977-1978	1	G	1954-04-09	Sturgeon Falls, ONT
Larry Giroux	73	11	49	60	256	1977-1978	1	D	1951-08-28	Weyburn, SASK
Lorry Gloeckner	51	0	17	17	44	1978-1979	1	D	1956-01-25	Kindersley, SASK
Danny Gruen	95	34	47	81	122	1977-1979	2	L	1952-06-26	Thunder Bay, ONT
Jean Hamel	        28	2	10	12	29	1977-1978	1	D	1952-06-06	Asbestos, PQ
Clark Hamilton	69	12	7	19	56	1977-1979	2	C		Islington, ONT
Dave Hanson	15	0	0	0	41	1977-1978	1	D	1954-04-12	Cumberland, WI
Terry Harper	22	0	13	13	36	1978-1979	1	D	1940-01-27	Regina, SASK
John Hilworth	105	5	22	27	226	1977-1979	2	D	1957-05-23	Jasper, ALTA
Willie Huber	10	2	7	9	12	1978-1979	1	D	1958-01-15	Strasskirchen, Germany
Len Ircandia	1	0	0	0	2	1977-1978	1	D	1954-07-28	Trail, BC
Dave Johns	        2	0	0	0	0	1978-1979	1	G		 
Bob Krieger	2	0	0	0	0	1977-1978	1	R	1952-10-05	Edina, MN
Fern LeBlanc	104	44	47	91	53	1977-1979	2	L	1956-01-12	Baie Comeau, PQ
Jean-Paul LeBlanc	118	40	68	108	114	1977-1979	2	C	1946-10-20	South Durham, PQ
Sylvain Locas	75	27	34	61	92	1978-1979	1	C	1958-02-17	Chicoutimi, PQ
Ron Low	        63	0	3	3	2	1978-1979	1	G	1950-06-21	Birtle, MAN
Jim Malazdrewicz	74	32	24	56	11	1978-1979	1	R	1958-03-11	Winnipeg, MAN
Don Martineau	61	16	15	31	31	1977-1978	1	R	1952-04-25	Kimberley, BC
Brian McCutcheon	60	17	16	33	27	1977-1978	1	F	1949-08-03	Toronto, ONT
Al McDonough	52	18	24	42	14	1977-1978	1	R	1950-06-06	St. Catharines, ONT
Jim Nahrgang	9	0	3	3	13	1977-1978	1	D	1951-04-17	Millbank, ONT
Ted Nolan	        73	12	38	50	66	1978-1979	1	L	1958-04-07	Sault Ste. Marie, ONT
Rob Plumb  	99	35	31	66	50	1977-1979	2	C	1957-08-29	Kingston, ONT
Jack Rankin	5	0	2	2	0	1977-1978	1	D	1953-05-23	San Diego, CA
Terry Richardson	63	0	3	3	21	1977-1978	1	G	1953-05-07	New Westminster, BC
Bob Ritchie	52	15	21	36	16	1977-1978	1	L	1955-02-20	Temiscaming, PQ
Tom Ross           1	0	0	0	0	1978-1979	1	C	1954-01-17	Detroit, MI
Derek Sanderson	4	1	3	4	0	1977-1978	1	C	1946-06-16	Niagara Falls, ONT
Kevin Schamehorn	36	5	3	8	113	1977-1978	1	R	1956-07-28	Victoria, BC
Dwight Schofield	35	4	11	15	78	1977-1979	2	D	1956-03-25	Lynn, MA
Tim Sheehy 	16	2	6	8	4	1977-1978	1	C	1948-09-03	International Falls, MN
Steve Short	51	3	11	14	216	1978-1979	1			 
Bjorn Skaare	37	8	26	34	18	1978-1979	1			 
Alan Stoneman	7	0	3	3	9	1978-1979	1	D	1958-03-01	Kansas City, MO
Ron Strelive	13	0	0	0	17	1978-1979	1	G	1961-03-16	Toronto, ONT
John Taft  	132	13	46	59	73	1977-1979	2	D	1958-03-08	Minneapolis, MN
Rick Vasko 	145	32	68	100	139	1977-1979	2	D	1957-01-12	St. Catharines, ONT
Fred Williams	32	0	6	6	12	1977-1978	1	C	1956-07-01	Saskatoon, SASK
Randy Wilson	13	4	7	11	4	1978-1979	1	W	1957-08-28	East Providence, RI
Larry Wright	51	6	24	30	17	1978-1979	1	C	1951-10-08	Regina, SASK

References

Central Professional Hockey League teams
Defunct Central Hockey League teams
Detroit Red Wings minor league affiliates
Professional ice hockey teams in Missouri
Ice hockey clubs established in 1977
Ice hockey clubs disestablished in 1979
1977 establishments in Missouri
1979 disestablishments in Missouri
Sports in the Kansas City metropolitan area